Pierre Louis (born in Mexico City, Mexico) is a Mexican actor; best known for his role as Centavito in the Mexican telenovela The Stray Cat. Subsequently, he obtained a regular role in the telenovela Enamorándome de Ramón, a Mexican version of the Venezuelan telenovela Tomasa Tequiero. Louis has mostly excelled in stage, in Mexican plays such as The Lion King (2015), a Mexican adaptation of the American musical. El corazón de las albercas (2017), and a Spanish adaptation of the plays Argonautika by Mary Zimmerman (2019), and The Pillowman by Martin McDonagh (2019).

Filmography

Films

Television roles

Music video

References

External links 
 

Living people
People from Mexico City
Mexican male telenovela actors
Mexican male television actors
Mexican stage actors
Mexican male stage actors
21st-century Mexican male actors
Year of birth missing (living people)